Redial may refer to:
Dialling again
Automatic redial in telecommunication
REDIAL (European Network of Information and Documentation on Latin America), the European organization
Of or concerning a redia, a stage in the development of a trematode